Valley View may refer to:

Places
 Valley View, Ooty, India
 Valley View, South Australia, Australia

United States
 Valley View, Kentucky
 Valley View, Ohio
 Valley View, Schuylkill County, Pennsylvania
 Valley View, York County, Pennsylvania
 Valley View, Texas
 Valley View (Carterville, Georgia), listed on the NRHP in Georgia
 Valley View (Romney, West Virginia), a 19th-century Greek Revival residence and farm 
 Valley View Site, Medary, Wisconsin, listed on the NRHP in Wisconsin

Schools
 Valley View Middle School (disambiguation)
 Valley View High School (disambiguation)
 Valley View Public School (disambiguation)
 Valley View School (Salida, Colorado), listed on the NRHP in Chaffee County
 Valley View Local School District

Other uses
 Valley View Center, a mall in Dallas, Texas, US
 Valley View Farm, Harriman, Tennessee, US listed on the NRHP in Tennessee
 Valley View Mall (Roanoke, Virginia), US

See also
 Valley View Ferry, Kentucky, US
 Valleyview (disambiguation)